William Cullen Hart (born June 14, 1971) is an American pop musician. He was a co-founder of The Elephant 6 Recording Company, as well as the rock band The Olivia Tremor Control. Following that band's breakup, Hart and several other former members regrouped to create Circulatory System.

Hart grew up in Ruston, Louisiana, with Bill Doss, Jeff Mangum and Robert Schneider. Doss and Hart (and, early on, Mangum) combined their musical efforts in The Olivia Tremor Control. Hart and Doss blended their differing musical inclinations for the band: Hart being known as the sonic experimenter, Doss the proponent of pop. This difference is evidently clear in the music produced by each since the end of the Olivia Tremor Control. Hart's Circulatory System maintains an interest in experimentation, while Doss' Sunshine Fix focused on more traditionally structured Beatlesque pop.

Will Cullen Hart is also a visual artist. He has created most, if not all, of the artwork for the Olivia Tremor Control and Circulatory System (among other Elephant 6 bands), as well as individual pieces.

In a 2008 online interview with John Fernandes, it was revealed that Hart has been diagnosed with multiple sclerosis.

References

External links
Cloud Recordings, the label founded by Hart
Review of Will's art book

1971 births
Living people
The Elephant 6 Recording Company artists
People with multiple sclerosis
Ruston High School alumni
21st-century American guitarists
The Olivia Tremor Control members